Greatham railway station served the village of Greatham in the Borough of Hartlepool, North East England, from 1841 to 1991 on what became the Durham Coast Line.

History 
The station was opened on 10 February 1841 as a stop on the Stockton and Hartlepool Railway, originally a branch line linking West Hartlepool to main line of the Clarence Railway near . Under the direction of the North Eastern Railway, a successor to the S&HR, a new line was constructed at Hartlepool in 1877 to provide a direct connection to the former Hartlepool Dock & Railway network operating northwards from the town, thus allowing through running towards  and beginning the process of integrating the S&HR into what would become the Durham Coast Line.

The station survived the Beeching cuts but was later downgraded to an unstaffed halt. It was ultimately closed to all traffic on 24 November 1991, after having its service reduced to minimal levels for much of the previous decade.

The disused station platforms remain at the site, but all station buildings have been demolished and the signal box will be demolished in October 2020.

References

External links 

Disused railway stations in the Borough of Hartlepool
Former North Eastern Railway (UK) stations
Railway stations in Great Britain opened in 1841
Railway stations in Great Britain closed in 1991
1841 establishments in England
1991 disestablishments in England
Greatham, County Durham